Wondosson Kassa, also known as Wond Wossen Kassa (1903 – 19 December 1936), was a member of the royalty of the Ethiopian Empire, an army commander, and a patriot.

Biography 
Leul Wondosson Kassa was the eldest son of Ras Kassa Haile Darge.  Ras Kassa was a loyal ally of Negus Tafari Makonnen, who ultimately was crowned Emperor Haile Selassie I of Ethiopia.

On 31 March 1930, during the Battle of Anchem, Wondosson Kassa made a name for himself fighting against and defeating Ras Gugsa Welle.  He fought for his father and the Imperial Army and was on the side of Negus Tafari Makonnen.  After Ras Gugsa Welle was killed, Negus Tafari gave Ras Kassa all of the lands controlled by Gugsa Welle.  As a result, Wondosson Kassa was made Shum of Begemder Province.

During the Second Italo-Ethiopian War, Wondosson Kassa again fought for his father on what was known as the "northern front." At the Second Battle of Tembien, the armies of his father and of Ras Seyum Mangasha were defeated in battle and bombed out of existence as they withdrew.  Wondosson joined his father and the Emperor and was at the Battle of Maychew. 

During the early days of the Italian occupation of Ethiopia, Wondosson Kassa was part of the armed Ethiopian resistance.  Late in July 1936, he took part in the ill-fated attack on Addis Ababa along with his younger brothers, Aberra Kassa and Asfawossen Kassa.  After the failure of that attack, he fled to avoid capture.  However, on 19 December 1936, Wondosson Kassa was captured by the Wollo Oromo in a cave near the source of the Tekezé River.  His place of capture was close to the Plains of Anchem where he had defeated Gugsa Welle in 1930.  Some of the Oromo who captured him are said to have been among the Oromo who arrived late for the Battle of Anchem.  Wondosson Kassa was executed by the Italians as a rebel.

See also
 Monarchies of Ethiopia
 Ethiopian aristocratic and court titles

Notes 
Footnotes

Citations

References 

Ethiopian nobility
Ethiopian Royal Family
Ethiopian princes
Ethiopian military personnel
Executed Ethiopian people
Executed military personnel
1903 births
1936 deaths